The Yiddish Book Center  (formerly the National Yiddish Book Center), located on the campus of Hampshire College in Amherst, Massachusetts, United States, is a cultural institution dedicated to the preservation of books in the Yiddish language, as well as the culture and history those books represent. It is one of ten western Massachusetts museums constituting the Museums10 consortium.

History
The Yiddish Book Center was founded in 1980 by Aaron Lansky, then a twenty-four-year-old graduate student of Yiddish literature and, the center's president. In the course of his studies, Lansky realized that untold numbers of irreplaceable Yiddish books were being discarded by American-born Jews unable to read the language of their Yiddish-speaking parents and grandparents. Lansky recounts the origins of the center in his 2004 memoir, Outwitting History.

At the time Lansky began his work, scholars estimated there were 70,000 Yiddish books still extant and recoverable. Since then, the Yiddish Book Center has recovered more than a million volumes, and it continues to receive thousands of new books each year from around the world.

In 1997, the Yiddish Book Center moved to its current site in Amherst, Massachusetts, a 49,000-square-foot complex that echoes the rooflines of an East European shtetl (Jewish town). The center is home to permanent and travelling exhibits, a Yiddish book repository, educational programs, and the annual Yidstock: The Festival of New Yiddish Music.

In 2010, the organization dropped the initial word "National" from its name, and is currently known as "Yiddish Book Center."

Based on a score of 100, Charity Navigator rated the Yiddish Book Center 79.82% for its financials and 97% for accountability and transparency, resulting in an overall grade of 85.57.

Collections
The center has drawn on its duplicate holdings to distribute books to students and scholars, and to establish or strengthen collections at more than 700 research libraries, schools, and museums around the world.

The Yiddish Book Center includes a number of different collections: 
 In 1997, with a grant from the Righteous Persons Foundation, the center launched its Steven Spielberg Digital Yiddish Library, which has digitized and cataloged more than 12,000 Yiddish titles and made them available for free download from the Internet Archive. In 2012, the Yiddish Book Center formed a partnership with the National Library of Israel, which was launching its own project to digitize its entire Hebrew-alphabet collection, including thousands of Yiddish titles. The effort prompted The New York Times to declare Yiddish "proportionately the most accessible literature on the planet". As of the end of 2014, the titles in the Steven Spielberg Digital Yiddish Library have been downloaded 1.3 million times. 
 The David and Sylvia Steiner Yizkor Books Collection comprises hundreds of yizkor books, memorial volumes commemorating Jewish communities in East Europe that were destroyed in the Holocaust. The books in the collection can be searched online.
 The Noah Cotsen Library of Yiddish Children's Literature includes about 800 titles, both original Yiddish works and Yiddish translations of classic stories written in other languages. The majority of the titles, which come from the YIVO Institute for Jewish Research as well as from the center's own collection, have been digitized and included in the Steven Spielberg Digital Yiddish Library.
 The Sami Rohr Library of Recorded Yiddish Books is a collection of roughly 150 titles, including novels, short stories, nonfiction works, memoirs, essays, and poetry. The recordings were made at the Jewish Public Library of Montreal (JPL) in the 1980s and '90s by native Yiddish-speaking volunteers. 
 The Frances Brandt Online Yiddish Audio Library comprises recordings of lectures by, and interviews with, writers and poets who visited the JPL between 1953 and 2005. The Yiddish Book Center is now working with the JPL to digitize the recordings. Ultimately, approximately 1,100 recordings from the collection will be digitized and accessible.

Public programs and resources
The center offers public programs related to Yiddish and Jewish culture. Each year, the center hosts two visiting exhibits in its Brechner Gallery. It also has a number of permanent exhibits: the Lee & Alfred Hutt Discovery Gallery, an interactive exhibit on Jewish cultural identity; Unquiet Pages focused on Yiddish literature; A Living Connection: Photographs from the An-sky Expeditions, 1912-14 on the work of ethnographer S. An-sky; Sholem-Bayes: Reflections on the American Jewish Home; the Nancy B. Weinstein, Kindervinkl (children's corner); the Appelbaum-Driker Theater, with exhibits on Yiddish film and radio; and a reproduction Yiddish Print Shop with displays about the Yiddish press in the twentieth century.

Pakn Treger (Yiddish for "book peddler"), the magazine of the Yiddish Book Center, is an English-language magazine that covers subjects related to Yiddish culture and literature as well as news from the center. Its annual translation issue, a digital publication, features newly translated works of Yiddish literature.

Educational programs
The center's online and in-person educational programs include the Steiner Summer Yiddish Program for college students, the Great Jewish Books Summer Program for high school students, a Great Jewish Books Teacher Workshop, a fellowship program, a translation fellowship, as well as online and on-site classes for adult learners, including the Bossie Dubowick YiddishSchool. The center also offers a field trip program for middle and high school students.

In 2001, Ruthe B. Cowl (1912–2008) of Laredo, Texas, donated $1 million to create the Jack and Ruthe B. Cowl Center, which promotes "Yiddish literary, artistic, musical, and historical knowledge and accomplishment" at the center. Early in 2007, Cowl donated another $750,000 to create the Cowl Jewish Leadership Program for promising college students.

Translation and other initiatives
In 2013, the center launched a translation effort that includes a translation fellowship program; a publishing venture; Taytsh.org, a website and interactive resource for working Yiddish-to-English translators; and an annual digital Pakn Treger translation anthology. In 2019, the center established White Goat Press, the Yiddish Book Center's imprint. White Goat Press is committed to bringing newly translated work to the widest readership possible, publishing work in all genres. As of 2022, White Goat Press has releases 5 titles including In eynem: The New Yiddish Textbook.

References

External links
 
 Books digitized by Yiddish Book Center in the Internet Archive
 Yizkor Books | Memorial Volumes Commemorating Jewish Communities Destroyed in the Holocaust
 Pakn Treger, the magazine of the Yiddish Book Center,

American book websites
Ashkenazi Jewish culture in Massachusetts
Hampshire College
Jewish-American history
Jewish libraries
Jewish museums in the United States
Jews and Judaism in Massachusetts
Libraries in Hampshire County, Massachusetts
Museums in Hampshire County, Massachusetts
Research institutes established in 1980
Yiddish culture in the United States
Yiddish-language literature
Library buildings completed in 1997
Cultural infrastructure completed in 1997
Buildings and structures in Amherst, Massachusetts
1980 establishments in Massachusetts